Hassan Ridgeway (born November 2, 1994) is an American football defensive tackle for the Houston Texans of the National Football League (NFL). He played college football at Texas, and was drafted by the Indianapolis Colts in the fourth round (116th overall) of the 2016 NFL Draft.

Early years
Ridgeway attended Mansfield High School in Mansfield, Texas. He committed to the University of Texas at Austin to play college football.

College career
Ridgeway played at Texas from 2012 to 2015. During his career, he played in 36 games with 18 starts, recording 92 tackles and 9.5 sacks. After his junior year he entered the 2016 NFL Draft.

Professional career

Indianapolis Colts
Ridgeway was drafted in the fourth round (116th overall) of the 2016 NFL draft by the Indianapolis Colts. He signed his rookie contract with the Colts on May 5, 2016. In his first three years with the Colts, Ridgeway played in 34 games, recording 41 tackles and 4.5 sacks.

Philadelphia Eagles
On April 27, 2019, Ridgeway was traded to the Philadelphia Eagles for a seventh round pick (246th overall) in the 2019 NFL Draft. He began the 2019 season as a reserve, playing in the first two games behind Fletcher Cox and Malik Jackson. Jackson suffered a foot injury in week 1 and replacement Timmy Jernigan also suffered a foot injury in week 2, which led to Ridgeway starting the next five games alongside Cox. In a week 7 game against the Dallas Cowboys, Ridgeway suffered an ankle injury that caused him to be placed on injured reserve on October 23, 2019.

Ridgeway re-signed with the Eagles on a one-year contract on March 24, 2020. In week 7 against the Giants, Ridgeway suffered a bicep injury and was placed on injured reserve on October 26.

On March 18, 2021, Ridgeway re-signed with the Eagles.

San Francisco 49ers
On March 21, 2022, Ridgeway signed a one-year contract with the San Francisco 49ers.

Houston Texans
On March 18, 2023, Ridgeway signed a one-year contract with the Houston Texans.

Career statistics

References

External links
 
San Francisco 49ers bio
Texas Longhorns bio

1994 births
Living people
People from Mansfield, Texas
Sportspeople from the Dallas–Fort Worth metroplex
Players of American football from Texas
American football defensive tackles
Texas Longhorns football players
Indianapolis Colts players
Philadelphia Eagles players
San Francisco 49ers players
Houston Texans players